Creutzfeldt may mean:
 Hans Gerhard Creutzfeldt - German neuropathologist.
 Otto Detlev Creutzfeldt - German physiologist and neurologist, son of Hans Gerhard Creutzfeldt.
 Creutzfeldt–Jakob disease - degenerative CNS disorder, named after the authors who first described it.